The 1989–90 Xavier Musketeers men's basketball team represented Xavier University from Cincinnati, Ohio in the 1989–90 season. Led by head coach Pete Gillen, the Musketeers finished with a 28–5 record (12–2 MCC), won the MCC regular season title, and received an at-large bid to the NCAA tournament as the #6 seed in the Midwest region. In the NCAA tournament, the Musketeers defeated Kansas State and Georgetown to reach the Sweet Sixteen. Xavier lost to Texas in the Midwest regional semifinals – a game that was played in Dallas, Texas.

Roster

Schedule and results

|-
!colspan=9 style=| Regular season

|-
!colspan=9 style=| Midwestern Collegiate Conference Tournament

|-
!colspan=9 style=| NCAA Tournament

NBA draft

References

Xavier
Xavier Musketeers men's basketball seasons
Xavier